Sidney is a 2022 American documentary film directed by Reginald Hudlin. The film is a portrait of the life and legacy of actor Sidney Poitier.

The film premiered at the Toronto International Film Festival on September 10, 2022, and was released on Apple TV+ on September 23.

References

External links
 

2022 films
2022 documentary films
2020s American films
2020s English-language films
American documentary films
Apple TV+ original films
Documentary films about actors
Documentary films about African Americans
Films directed by Reginald Hudlin
Harpo Productions films